Gulf Rangers youth group (Hebrew: Shomrei Mifratz שומרי המפרץ) was established in 2004 by the Society for the Conservation of the Red Sea Environment, an environmental non-profit, volunteer NGO located in the southern Israeli city of Eilat. The Gulf Rangers program was created to empower local youth to preserve the sea environment and prevent further damage. The program curriculum develops the teenagers' sense of social responsibility through a combination of education and activism. After training, they are ready to become environmental leaders in their home community.

Objectives
Goal The ultimate goal of the Gulf Rangers program is to engage youth and the local community in the protection and preservation of the Gulf of Eilat for future generations to enjoy. Each year, between 40 and 60 youths aged 14–18, from Eilat and the neighboring Arava region, register for the program. Today there are about 500 graduates of the Gulf Rangers program.

The program is run by Mori Chen, a Society for the Conservation of the Red Sea Environment board member. Youth volunteering with the Gulf Rangers program take part in environmental trainings, including a certified diving course. This after school program consists of diving tuition, lectures, and presentations. Participants learn about the Red Sea, the environment, and the importance of recycling. Rangers also tour outdoor areas with experts who teach about the environment of Eilat and the Arava. The educational curriculum is designed to build individual's commitment to the environment and develop teamwork skills that serve the group in their community activities.

Community
Gulf Rangers spearhead environmental activities that contribute to the sustainability of the Red Sea. Once a month, equipped with red trash bags, the group participates in organized clean-up dives into the Red Sea. They spend up to an hour clearing the sea bed and corals of cigarette butts, plastic bags, glass bottles, soda and beer cans, ice-cream wrappers, debris, tires, and more. After each dive, the group gathers to sort the garbage. Municipality workers then take it away to disposal and recycling facilities. The Rangers remove approximately 300 kilos of trash from the Red Sea every year.

Rangers also clean up wadis (ephemeral river beds) around Eilat. By doing this, they prevent trash and contamination channeling into the Red Sea.

Rangers regularly participate in community environmental campaigns. They also patrol Eilat's beaches at weekends to teach the local community and tourists about environmental issues and threats to the sustainability of the Red Sea. As part of the program, Rangers become role models and mentors, teaching Eilat's elementary school children about recycling and their clean-up activities.

Awards
The Gulf Rangers program has gained the personal commendation of the city's mayor, Meir Yitzhak Halevy. In 2013, the group won the Negev Prize for the Environment and in 2014 was shortlisted for the Yediot Ahronot Green Heroes award.

Environmental organizations based in Israel